The Nomenclature of Territorial Units for Statistics (NUTS) is a geographical standard used by Albania in order to divide its territory into regions at three different levels of specified classes of its population codified by the Albanian Institute of Statistics (INSTAT). Albania is a recognised candidate country for membership of the European Union (EU) and thus part of the classification. The three hierarchical levels are known as NUTS-1, NUTS-2 and NUTS-3, moving from larger to smaller territorial divisions.

Overall

Regions 

The NUTS codes are as follows:

References 

Albania
Nuts